Apium australe is a species of the genus Apium of the family Apiaceae. It is an perennial herb with a distribution in salt-marsh and saline habitats of Southern South America.

References

australe
Plants described in 1979